Hugo Jury (13 July 1887 – 8 May 1945) was an Austrian Nazi. He held the offices of Gauleiter of Reichsgau Niederdonau and Reichsstatthalter (Reich Governor) for Lower Austria. He committed suicide at the end of the World War II.

Early life
Jury was the son of Hugo Jury (1856-1931) a teacher in Rothmühl, Moravia and Julia Jury (1862-1934, née Haberhauer). Educated in the local gymnasium, he began studying medicine at the Karl Ferdinand University in Prague in 1905. On 31 October 1911, he received his doctorate in medicine. On 14 January 1913, he married Karoline Roppert in Vienna. After his internship, Jury served temporarily as a ship's doctor. After several voyages, he then worked from 1913 to 1919 as a community health doctor in Frankenfels.

During the First World War he was called up to serve as a doctor in a military hospital. He was then employed as chief physician of a POW officers' camp, not far from Frankenfels. Discharged in 1919, he began medical practice as a pulmonary specialist in tuberculosis in St. Pölten.

Career in Austria
Jury became a member of the Austrian right-wing organization, the Heimwehr, in 1927. On 15 February 1931, he joined the Austrian Nazi Party. In St. Pölten he was Nazi Party local group leader and in 1932 leader of his party faction in the municipal council. After the Austrian Nazi Party was banned on 19 June 1933, he continued to work underground, for which he was arrested and detained several times.

He became deputy head of the illegal Nazi Party in 1936 and held this function until 1938. After the reorganization of the government forced on Chancellor Kurt Schuschnigg by Adolf Hitler, Jury was appointed to the Austrian State Council on 20 February 1938 and became deputy to Arthur Seyss-Inquart, the Nazi Austrian Interior Minister. On 11 March 1938, Jury was appointed Minister for Social Administration in the short-lived federal government of now Chancellor Seyss-Inquart. On 12 March he joined the SS with the rank of Sturmbannführer.

Career under the Third Reich
After the Anschluss of Austria to the German Reich, Jury remained head of the same Social Administration Ministry in the state government of Austria until 24 May 1938. In April he was elected a Nazi member of the Reichstag. On 21 May 1938, he was appointed by Hitler as the Nazi Party Gauleiter of the Reichsgau Niederdonau. On 24 May, he was named Landeshauptmann for the state of Lower Austria, thus uniting under his control the highest party and governmental offices in his jurisdiction.

In March 1939 he became the head of the party liaison office for the Protectorate of Bohemia and Moravia. On 15 March 1940 he was appointed as Reichsstatthalter (Reich Governor) of Lower Austria, effective 1 April. On 16 November 1942, he became the Reich Defense Commissioner for his Gau. On 15 June 1943, Heinrich Himmler named him the Reich Commissioner for the Consolidation of German Nationality in his Gau. He was promoted to SS-Obergruppenführer on 21 June 1943.

Hugo Jury was an ardent advocate of Nazi racial policies. He supported the persecution of Jews, Sinti and Roma, as well as the mentally or physically incapacitated. Jury particularly was interested in “Germanizing” his home region of Moravia, some administrative districts of which were administered as part of Reichsgau Niederdonau. On 23 March 1945, Jury attended a conference with Heinrich Himmler, other Austrian Nazi leaders and the commandant of the Mauthausen concentration camp. Himmler ordered the evacuation of all camp inmates in Austria, decreeing that none should fall into Allied hands. On 15 April, Jury ordered the execution of 44 prisoners at the Stein prison in Krems.

Towards the end of the war, when Vienna was in peril of falling to the Red Army, Jury fled westward and arrived in Krems. Jury, a fanatical Nazi, continued to call for armed resistance, personally commanding a Volkssturm force against Soviet forces. After the final collapse of Nazi Germany, on the night of 8 May 1945, Hugo Jury committed suicide by shooting himself in the town of Zwettl.

He was reputed to have been one of the lovers of Elisabeth Schwarzkopf.

Awards and decorations
War Merit Cross 2nd Class without Swords

Notes

References
Karl Höffkes: Hitlers Politische Generale. Die Gauleiter des Dritten Reiches: ein biographisches Nachschlagewerk. Grabert-Verlag, Tübingen, 1986, .
 
 

1887 births
1945 deaths
People from Svitavy District
Moravian-German people
Austrian politicians
Gauleiters
Nazi Party officials
Nazis who committed suicide in Austria
Suicides by firearm in Austria
Austrian people of Moravian-German descent
Members of the Reichstag of Nazi Germany
1945 suicides
Volkssturm personnel
Austrian mass murderers